Bangadarshan was a Bengali literary magazine, founded by Bankim Chandra Chattopadhyay in 1872, and resuscitated in 1901 under the editorship of Rabindranath Tagore. The magazine had a defining influence on the emergence of a Bengali identity and the genesis of nationalism in Bengal.

Many of Bankim's novels were serialized in this magazine, which also carried work by writers such as the Sanskrit scholar Haraprasad Shastri, the literary critic Akshay Chandra Sarkar, and other intellectuals. It carried many articles on the Puranas, the Vedas and the Vedanta,  reflecting a reaction within Bengali intellectual community (the bhadralok culture) to "negotiate with the set of ideas coming in the name of modernity by incorporating and appropriating the masses."

Bankim articulated his objectives in creating the magazine as one of: 
"...making it the medium of communication and sympathy between the educated and the uneducated classes...  the English language for good or evil has become our vernacular; and this tends daily to widen the gulf between the higher and lower ranks of Bengali society.  Thus I think that we ought to disanglicise ourselves so as to speak to the masses in the language which they may understand." Haraprasad Shastri also echoed this spirit: "What is the purpose of Bangadarshan? Knowledge has to be filtered down.".

But the magazine was far more than a mere dispenser of intellectual knowledge. It was the intoxicating mix of stories that readers waited with bated breath, particularly for the next serialization of a novel by Bankim. Besides the readership among Bengali intelligentsia, the magazine was also widely read among the Bengali-literate women.
 
The first novel to be serialized here was the stunning Vishabriksha ("poison tree") on 1873. It was followed by Indira in the same year and Yugalanguriya in 1874. Indeed, nearly all of Bankim's subsequent novels were published in this magazine.

In 1876, after Radharani and Chandrashekhar had come out, the magazine faced a hiatus.  After a short period though, Bankim's brother Sanjibchandra Chattopadhyay resuscitated the magazine, and Bankim remained a major contributor. His novels  
Rajani,  Krishnakanter will and the Rajput novel Rajasimha were featured between 1877 and 1881.  Particularly notable is the publication of Anandamath (1882), the story of a revolt by a group of ascetic warriors; though the battle is against the Muslim forces, the British power lurks in the background.  
This novel also contains the song Bande Mataram.

The impact of the magazine in 19th-century Bengal can be gauged from Rabindranath Tagore's recollections of reading it as a boy - he was only eleven when Bangadarshan was launched. "It was bad enough to have to wait till the next monthly number was out, but to be kept waiting further till my elders had done with it was simply intolerable." Prof Santanu Banerjee observed: "There is hardly any magazine apart from Bangadarshan in the world to claim the glory of publishing two National Song of two separate country".  
    
In the late 1880s, the magazine was eventually no longer in publication.

The "new" Bangadarshan
In 1901, a "new" Bangadarshan was published by Saileshchandra Majumdar, with Rabindranath Tagore as its editor.  This magazine carried a large number of Tagore's writings; while he had been writing short stories until now, the pressures of the magazine got him into the genre of the novel: his first full-length novel, Chokher Bali was written for serialization in the magazine, and remains one of the most famous psychological novels in Bengali literature. The magazine was published on a monthly basis.

The philosophy of the magazine was similar to that of the earlier, and the aim was to fuel a budding nationalistic spirit.  The publisher's office, called "Majumdar Agency", became a meeting point for many intellectuals and literary spirits. 
During the Bangabhanga Andolan (1905 Partition of Bengal), the magazine became a hotbed of protest. A large number of poems from Tagore's Gitanjali period (and earlier) also came out in the magazine; this included Amar Sonar Bangla, today the national anthem of Bangladesh.

References

External links
 Bangadarshan - South Asia Archive

Literary magazines published in India
Bengali-language magazines
Magazines established in 1872
1872 establishments in India
Defunct magazines published in India
Magazines with year of disestablishment missing
Defunct literary magazines
Monthly magazines published in India